Frederick Bailey may refer to:

Frederick Manson Bailey (1827–1915), Australian botanist  
Frederick Marshman Bailey (1882–1967), British intelligence officer and adventurer
Frederick Bailey (forester) (c. 1842–1912) British soldier and forester, father of Frederick Marshman Bailey
Frederick Bailey (cricketer) (1919–1985), English cricketer
Frederick Bailey (priest) (died 1965), Archdeacon of Malta
Ricky Bailey (born 1997), English rugby league player
Frederick Bailey, playwright and screenwriter,  works include Equalizer 2000
Frederick Augustus Washington Bailey, birth name of Frederick Douglass (1818–1895), American social reformer, abolitionist, orator, writer, and statesman

See also
Fred Bailey (1895–1972), American baseball player
Frederick Bailey Deeming (1853–1892), English-born Australian murderer